Spencerhydrus is a genus of beetles in the family Dytiscidae. The genus is found only in southern Australia and contains the following two species:

 Spencerhydrus latecinctus Sharp, 1882
 Spencerhydrus pulchellus Sharp, 1882

References

Dytiscidae